John Roger Hammond (21 March 1936 – 8 November 2012) was an English character actor who appeared in many films and television series.

Hammond's father was a chartered accountant and managing director of a cotton mill. John attended Stockport Grammar School for two years followed by Bryanston School in Dorset. He then went to Emmanuel College, Cambridge, where he initially read English, then switched to archaeology and anthropology and he appeared extensively in their drama programme, alongside actors such as Ian McKellen and Derek Jacobi. Following that, he attended the Royal Academy of Dramatic Art. In 1963, he joined the Arts Theatre Company, and appeared in a number of productions there, including productions of the associated Unicorn Theatre.

In 1964, Hammond made his first television appearance, as Tidiman in an episode of The Villains, and his first film appearance the next year. Although he worked primarily as a television actor in his early years, from the 1990s his career was more focused on film, and his credits boast an impressive 125 credits in a variety of roles, ranging from all sorts of genres, although mostly in costume dramas and period pieces.  Hammond's credits include the Prince of Wales in The Duchess of Duke Street, Valence in A Dangerous Man: Lawrence After Arabia, and Cecil in A Good Woman. Hammond was also cast as a clergyman several times, including as the Archbishop in Ian McKellen's Richard III, the Bishop de Cambrai in The Princes in the Tower, and as the Chief Augur in the HBO television drama Rome.

In 1984 he appeared as agoraphobic bookmaker Albert Wendle in the Minder episode Get Daley!

Hammond additionally contributed to some audio books on tape, appearing in Rosencrantz and Guildenstern Are Dead, Henry IV, Parts 1 and 2, and The Tempest.

Death
Hammond died aged 76 of cancer, leaving, by his former wife, Helen (née Weir; married 1968, divorced 1975), a son, Daniel.

Film and television credits

Bachelor of Hearts (1958) .... Undergraduate pushing the car (uncredited)
Game for Three Losers (1965) .... Peter Fletcher
The Avengers (1967, TV series) - Return of the Cybernauts - Prof Russell 
Lock Up Your Daughters (1969) .... Johnsonian Figure
A Touch of Love (1969) .... Mike
Catweazle (1970, TV Series) .... Boris
Play for Today (1971, Episode: "Edna, the Inebriate Woman") .... Victor, Helper at 'Jesus Saves'
The Pied Piper (1972) .... Burger
Sutherland's Law (1972, TV Movie) .... Sheriff
Adult Fun (1972) .... Mr. Bryant
Because of the Cats (1973) .... Maris
Royal Flash (1975) .... Master
When the Boat Comes In (1976, Episode: "A Land Fit for Heroes and Idiots") .... Maj. Reginald Leslie Pinner
The Duchess of Duke Street (1976, TV Series) .... Prince of Wales
Queen Kong (1976) .... Woolf
The Hunchback of Notre Dame (1976 TV film) .... Lecomu
Edward and Mrs. Simpson (1978, TV Mini-Series) .... Sir Harold Nicolson
The Good Soldier (1981, TV Movie) .... Grand Duke
The Adventures of Sherlock Holmes (1984, Episode: "The Red-Headed League") .... Jabez Wilson
 Amy (1984, TV film) .... Sir Sefton Brancker
Minder (1984, Episode: "Get Daley!") .... Albert Wendell
Morons from Outer Space (1985) .... Soundman
Nemesis (Miss Marple) (1986) ....Broadribb, solicitor
Foreign Body (1986) .... Pub landlord
Farrington of the F.O. (1986-1987, TV Series) .... Josef / Jose Gonzales
Little Dorrit (1987) .... Mr. Meagles
Madame Sousatzka (1988) .... Lefranc
The Fool (1990) .... Augustus Roddick
Screen Two (1990, Episode: "Fellow Traveller") .... Tudor Hamilton
Performance (1991, Episode: "Uncle Vanya") .... Waffles
Edward II (1991) .... Bishop
A Dangerous Man: Lawrence after Arabia (1992, TV Movie) .... Valence
Orlando (1992) .... Swift
As You Like It (1992) .... Mr. Lebeau
The Madness of King George (1994) .... Baker
Richard III (1995) .... Archbishop
Screen Two (1995, Episode: "Persuasion") .... Mr. Musgrove
The Ghostbusters of East Finchley (1995) .... Mr. Gleeson 
The Ruth Rendell Mysteries (1996) .... Dr. Trewynne
The Secret Agent (1996) .... Mr. Michaelis
Sixth Happiness (1997) .... Father Ferre
Solomon (1997) .... Zadok
Monk Dawson (1998) .... Fr Julian
The Tichborne Claimant (1998) .... Cubitt
Drop The Dead Donkey (1998, TV Series) .... Sir Roysten Merchant
The Clandestine Marriage (1999) .... Traverse
A Christmas Carol (1999, TV Movie) .... Second Broker
The Strange Case of Delfina Potocka: The Mystery of Chopin (1999) .... Schwabe
Up at the Villa (2000) .... Colin Mackenzie
Shrink (2000, Short) .... Claus
Bedazzled (2000) .... Play Actor
Victoria & Albert (2001, TV Movie) .... Duke of Coburg
Redemption Road (2001) .... Old Man
Possession (2002) .... Professor Spear
Vacuums (2002) .... DJ Johnson
Around the World in 80 Days (2004) .... Lord Rhodes
A Good Woman (2004) .... Cecil
Rome (2005, TV Series) .... Chief Augur
Princes in the Tower (2005, TV Movie) .... Bishop de Cambrai
Keeping Mum (2006) .... Judge
Van Wilder 2: The Rise of Taj (2007) .... Camford Dean
Quest for a Heart (2007) .... Elder (English version, voice)
The King's Speech (2010) .... Dr. Blandine Bentham (final film role)

Partial stage credits
Camino Real ... Baron de Charlus
A Month in the Country ... Arkady Srgeitch Islaev
Deutsches Haus ... Griben
Love's Labours ... Charles
Three Sisters ... Andrey
Caesar and Cleopatra ... Pothinus
Arsenic and Old Lace ... Dr. Einstein
Luther ... Eck
I, John Brown ... Jack McGrew
Salad Days ... Timothy's Father / Butterfly Catcher
The Corn is Green ... The Squire
The Public Eye ... Charles Sidley
Serjeant Musgrave's Dance ... The Mayor
All in Good Time ... Leslie Piper
Lady Windermere's Fan ... Dumby
The Importance of Being Earnest ... Rev. Dr. Chasuble
The Madness of King George ... Baker
'Tis Pity She's a Whore ... Donado
The Seagull ... Shamraev
Donkeys' Years ... Tate
Poor Bitos ... Mirabeau
The Cherry Orchard ... Pishchik

Other projects, contributions
When Love Speaks (2002, EMI Classics) – Shakespeare's "Sonnet 119" ("What potions have I drunk of siren tears")
Fable 2 Chieftain of Knothole Island – Lionhead Studios
The Screwtape Letters (2009, Focus on the Family Radio Theatre) - Toadpipe

References

External links

1936 births
2012 deaths
Alumni of RADA
Alumni of Emmanuel College, Cambridge
People educated at Bryanston School
People educated at Stockport Grammar School
Actors from Stockport
English male film actors
English male television actors
20th-century English male actors
21st-century English male actors